Rusan is a community in the Vlorë County, Albania. It is part of the municipality Delvinë. The village is inhabited by Muslim Albanians. In the village is found the Gjin Aleksi's Mosque.

References

Populated places in Delvinë
Villages in Vlorë County